Ruth Wolf-Rehfeldt is a German artist associated with visual poetry and mail art. In 1955 she married the fellow artist Robert Rehfeldt in Berlin. A collection of her work was part of the 2017 documenta 14 art exhibition.

Education and employment 
She was employed as an office manager, and working as a self-taught artist under a regime of strict surveillance in the former German Democratic Republic. She turned herself into a typist—a stereotypical female job—to enable control over the content of her pages. She practiced camouflage: aptly “sterilized” and imbued with mechanic anonymity, her signs resisted alienation to broadcast free messages and to communicate openly.

Works 
She is known particularly for a period of geometric and poetic typewriter graphics art that she calls "typewritings" produced between the 1970s and 1990, mostly as part of Mail Art collaborations. Her work is interested in environmental issues and human rights.

Mail art allowed Wolf-Rehfeldt to communicate and form networks with artists living under totalitarian regimes similar to hers during a time of international isolation. These works traveled the globe, sent as postcards from Ruth Wolf-Rehfeldt in the GDR capital of Berlin to Western Europe, the Eastern Bloc, North America, Latin America, Asia, New Caledonia. No rules and no restrictions, besides formats and postage fees to ensure circulation: by distributing free artworks to a community of participants along rhizomatic routes, mail art eluded the diktats of censorship and market alike. Kunstpostbriefe (art letters) operated as free spaces of exhibition, exchange, and personal correspondence.

References

External links 
 Mail Artists Index
 Doreen Mende on Ruth Wolf-Rehfeldt for art agenda 2/2015: “Ruth Wolf-Rehfeldt: Signs Fiction” and “HOME ARCHIVES: Paulo Bruscky & Robert Rehfeldt’s Mail Art Exchanges from East Berlin to South America”, 2015
 Anne Thurmann-Jajes: Robert Rehfeldt and Ruth Wolf-Rehfeldt  Anne Thurmann-Jajes: Robert Rehfeldt and Ruth Wolf-Rehfeldt, 2013
https://albertinum.skd.museum/en/exhibitions/for-ruth-the-sky-in-los-angeles/

German contemporary artists
German artists
1932 births
Living people